Number 17 is a 1925 thriller play by the British writer Joseph Jefferson Farjeon.

It premiered at the Winter Gardens Theatre in New Brighton before beginning a West End run of 209 performances, initially at the New Theatre before transferring to Wyndham's and then the Duke of York's Theatre. The original cast included Nicholas Hannen, Fred Groves, Leon M. Lion and Nora Swinburne.

The following year he wrote a novelisation of the play, published by Hodder and Stoughton.

Adaptations

Film
1928, German silent film directed by Géza von Bolváry
1932, film Number Seventeen directed by Alfred Hitchcock.
1949, Swedish film directed by Gösta Stevens.

Television
1958, programme adapted by Juan Cortés and directed by Cyril Butcher, part of the ITV Play of the Week series.

Radio
1938, for BBC Radio produced by Leslie Stokes.
1938, for BBC Radio produced by Howard Rose.

References

Bibliography
 Goble, Alan. The Complete Index to Literary Sources in Film. Walter de Gruyter, 1999.
 Wearing, J. P. The London Stage 1920-1929: A Calendar of Productions, Performers, and Personnel. Rowman & Littlefield, 2014.

1925 plays
Plays set in England
British plays adapted into films
Plays set in London
Plays by Joseph Jefferson Farjeon
West End plays